The 1982 Boston Red Sox season was the 82nd season in the franchise's Major League Baseball history. The Red Sox finished third in the American League East with a record of 89 wins and 73 losses, six games behind the Milwaukee Brewers, who went on to win the AL championship.

Offseason 
 February 25, 1982: Mark Fidrych was signed as a free agent by the Red Sox.

Regular season

Highlights 
In his second year as Red Sox manager, Ralph Houk kept the Sox clubhouse on an even keel, and while Boston helped make the season interesting, it was the Milwaukee Brewers all the way finishing at 95–67, one game ahead of the Baltimore Orioles, and six up on third-place Boston.

Boston's best that year was a bullpen featuring Mark Clear, with 14 wins and 14 saves, and Bob Stanley, with 12 wins and 14 saves. John Tudor, who had been a disappointing 4–3 in 1981, was 13–10. Dennis Eckersley was 13–13 and Mike Torrez 9–9. Torrez would be traded in the offseason.

Carney Lansford hit .301 this year, only his second, and his last as a Red Sox. Jim Rice hit .309, with 24 homers and 97 RBIs, and Dwight Evans had another big year: .292, 32 homers and 98 RBIs. Carl Yastrzemski, heading toward the end of his career, hit .275, with 16 homers and 72 RBIs. A catcher named Rich Gedman from Worcester, Massachusetts, hit .249. A rookie also came up and surprised a lot of people: Wade Boggs had been the top hitter in the minors the previous year but had a hard time staying with Boston. He made his major league debut on April 10, 1982, in a game against the Baltimore Orioles, going 0-for-4. Once he got into the lineup on June 25, when Lansford was hurt, he stayed on and hit .349.

Season standings

Record vs. opponents

Notable transactions 
 June 7, 1982: In the 1982 Major League Baseball draft, the Red Sox drafted Sam Horn in the first round (16th pick) and Kevin Romine in the second round.

Opening Day lineup 
Opening Day had been scheduled for April 5 at Comiskey Park again the Chicago White Sox, but it was postponed due to snow. Additional games were also postponed due to weather conditions. The team finally started their season on April 10, with a doubleheader against the Baltimore Orioles at Memorial Stadium.

Source:

Alumni game
Before a scheduled game with the Texas Rangers on May 1, the Red Sox held their first old-timers game at Fenway, marking 50-years of ownership by the Yawkey family. It was notable for the participation of 63-year-old Red Sox legend Ted Williams, who made a shoestring catch while playing the outfield. Other participants included Bobby Doerr, Boo Ferriss, Jackie Jensen, Bob Montgomery, Johnny Pesky, and Jimmy Piersall.

Roster

Statistical leaders 

Source:

Batting 

Source:

Pitching 

Source:

Awards and honors 
 Dwight Evans – Gold Glove Award (OF)

All-Star Game
 Mark Clear, reserve P
 Dennis Eckersley, starting P
 Carl Yastrzemski, reserve OF

Farm system 

Source:

References

External links 
1982 Boston Red Sox team at Baseball-Reference
1982 Boston Red Sox season at baseball-almanac.com

Boston Red Sox seasons
Boston Red Sox
Boston Red Sox
Red Sox